Parapsectris konradi is a moth in the family Gelechiidae. It was described by Oleksiy V. Bidzilya in 2010. It is found in Zimbabwe.

References

Endemic fauna of Zimbabwe
Parapsectris
Moths described in 2010